is a Japanese model who is represented by the talent agency, Illume.

Biography
Kuzuoka graduated from Miyagi Prefecture Third Girls High School. She was mainly active in Sendai, and later appeared in the fashion magazine, Ray, and later moved to Tokyo from 2010. After that, Kuzuoka became an exclusive model for AneCam.

Her favorite colors are white, black, green, gold, and pink.

Kuzuoka has a brother.

Filmography

Magazines

Other

DVD

TV series

Advertisements

Stills

Categories

Net catalogs

Fashion shows

Events

Other

Sendai era
These are during when she was belonged to MOC Fashion Model Agency in Sendai.

TV series

Advertisements

Magazines

Fashion shows

References

External links
 
Official profile 

Japanese female models
1984 births
Living people
Models from Miyagi Prefecture